İbrahim Yattara (born 3 June 1980 in Kamsar), or İbrahim Üçüncü, is a Guinean former footballer.

He also once competed on Survivor Turkey.

Career
Yattara began his career in his native Guinea with the team San Garedi. He moved on to Athlético de Coléah, another Guinean club before embarking on his career in Europe. He joined Antwerp FC in Belgium in 2000 and was used primarily on the right side of midfield. Yattara joined Trabzonspor in 2003.

He played international football for Guinea and was part of the Guinea squad for the 2004 and 2006 African Cup of Nations tournaments in Tunisia and Egypt.

Playing style
Spanish coach Luis Aragones once stated that Yattara's playing style is very similar to Ronaldinho.

Career statistics

Club

International goals

Honours
Trabzonspor
 Turkish Cup: 2003–04, 2009–10
 Turkish Super Cup: 2010

References

External links

1980 births
Living people
Guinean footballers
Guinea international footballers
Guinean expatriate footballers
Turkish people of Guinean descent
Royal Antwerp F.C. players
Trabzonspor footballers
Al-Shabab FC (Riyadh) players
Mersin İdman Yurdu footballers
Süper Lig players
Belgian Pro League players
Expatriate footballers in Turkey
Guinean expatriate sportspeople in Turkey
Expatriate footballers in Belgium
Athlético de Coléah players
Expatriate footballers in Saudi Arabia
Guinean expatriate sportspeople in Saudi Arabia
2006 Africa Cup of Nations players
2012 Africa Cup of Nations players
Naturalized citizens of Turkey
Association football midfielders